The 2014–15 Lipscomb Bisons men's basketball team represented Lipscomb University during the 2014–15 NCAA Division I men's basketball season. The Bisons, led by second year head coach Casey Alexander, played their home games at Allen Arena and were members of the Atlantic Sun Conference. They finished the season 14–17, 7–7 in A-Sun play to finish in a tie for fourth place. They advanced to the semifinals of the A-Sun tournament where they lost to North Florida.

Roster

Schedule
Sources
 
|-
!colspan=9 style="background:#; color:white;"| Regular season

|-
!colspan=9 style="background:#; color:white;"| Atlantic Sun tournament

References

Lipscomb Bisons men's basketball seasons
Lipscomb